The Lauriston Road Cemetery is an historic Grade II listed Jewish cemetery on land east of Lauriston Road (formerly Grove Street) to the north of Royal Gate East, Victoria Park, Hackney in the East End of London, E9. The cemetery opened in 1788, having been purchased by the Germans' Hambro Synagogue in 1786. It was closed to further burials from 1886.

The cemetery is open to visitors by appointment only.

The London Garden Trust notes that there are "notable plane, and other semi-mature trees in the grounds, and numerous headstones and chest tombs set in grass."

History
There are records of a small Sephardic Jewish community in Hackney from the 18th century. After the first cemetery belonging to the Hambro Synagogue was closed in Hoxton Street in 1878 (and no longer exists), land east of Grove Road was bought by Leon Gompertz and other Ashkenazim acting on behalf of the synagogue. The land included a building, part of which was occupied by Sarah Tyssen (d. 1779), widow of Samuel Tyssen. When the cemetery was opened the Hackney area was largely undeveloped and the grounds served as a rural retreat with little changing until the arrival of the railways in the 1850s, allowing much faster connections to the City of London. The cemetery was extended in 1852 to the front but the grounds soon became dilapidated. In 1870 renovations of the cemetery took place, funded by Mrs Flatou to the sum of £1,200 in memory of her late husband Louis Victor Flatou.

Buildings and architecture
The lodge, walls and gates built in 1870 remain at the entrance to the grounds. The lodge has occasionally been let out as a residence and a doctor's surgery but, is now used as offices. In 1885, the prayer hall which stood next to the lodge was demolished despite its having been renovated only 15 years earlier.

Heritage listing
The surviving lodge, gates and railings are all locally listed by Hackney Council. The cemetery site also lies at the centre of the Victoria Park Conservation Area as designated by the Council. In March 2021 Historic England  listed, at Grade II, the whole of the cemetery along with "the lodge, gates and piers facing Lauriston Road and portion of the walling to the south of the graveyard".

The listing recognises the cemetery "has a lodge building, walls, railings and gates of 1870 by HH Collins" which are all well preserved and a rare survival from the period especially as a group. The listing recognises the importance of the cemetery for its architectural interest in the collection of 18th-century and 19th-century headstones and monuments along with the development of Jewish burial customs and assimilation into British society. Of historical interest is that the burial ground "was the first Jewish cemetery site in London to be laid out in a rural setting, beyond the initial cluster around Whitechapel".

Environment
Hackney Council lists the burial ground as "a haven for insects, birds and small mammals" with "a number of mature trees and shrubs". The council goes on to describe the land as one of the most positive features of the conservation area, "an important private open space" and "an important refuge for small wildlife and birds".

Future development
In 2018 Waugh Thistleton Architects were granted permission for the designs of a new contemporary synagogue on the site of the demolished prayer hall. The architects had been commissioned by United Synagogues to design the new multi-purpose building to "cater to the needs of the expanding local Jewish community, serving as a communal space and a forum to inspire dialogue about the Jewish religion and culture with new audiences."

The proposed new building, of engineered timber construction, was granted planning permission by Hackney Council despite opposition from local residents who objected to the potential disruption of local ecosystem and reduction in views across the cemetery from the road. The dissidents' petition, signed by 352 people, stated that local residents view the cemetery as a central part of their local neighbourhood, notwithstanding its status as a private site. The new building would be accompanied by renovation of the existing lodge and a change in its use to a community centre.

References 

Jewish cemeteries in the United Kingdom
1788 establishments in Great Britain
Hackney, London
Grade II listed buildings in the London Borough of Hackney